Andrea Fondelli (born 27 February 1994) is a water polo player from Italy. He was part of the Italian team at the 2016 Summer Olympics, where the team won the bronze medal.

See also
 List of Olympic medalists in water polo (men)

References

External links
 
 

1994 births
Living people
Water polo players from Genoa
Italian male water polo players
Water polo drivers
Water polo players at the 2016 Summer Olympics
Medalists at the 2016 Summer Olympics
Olympic bronze medalists for Italy in water polo
Competitors at the 2018 Mediterranean Games
Mediterranean Games competitors for Italy
World Aquatics Championships medalists in water polo